Welfare fraud is the act of illegally using state welfare systems by knowingly withholding or giving information to obtain more funds than would otherwise be allocated.

This article deals with welfare fraud in various countries of the world, and includes many social benefit programs such as food assistance, housing, unemployment benefits, Social Security, disability, and medical. Each country's problems and programs are varied. 
Obtaining reliable evidence of welfare fraud is notoriously difficult. Apart from the obvious methodological problems, research reveals that interviewing performance is often mediocre, and may be anecdotal, misunderstood, or collected from opinionated or biased caseworkers. Interviews with non-citizen welfare recipients, where the interviewer has succeeded in gaining a high level of trust, have shown that a very high percent fail to report incomes. Official figures of the prevalence of welfare fraud based on government investigation tend to be low – a few percent of the total amount of welfare spending. Statistical research indicates that the vast majority of fraud is committed by businesses serving the recipients of government benefits. Welfare or benefits fraud committed by recipients is usually of very modest sums, and is committed by people who struggle with poverty; but once started it often continues after reaching financial stability.

Welfare fraud in various countries

Australia
In Australia, entitlement reviews resulted in savings of AU$390.6 million in 2004-05.

Austria
Welfare fraud has been estimated to over 1.1 billion Euros, or 1.32% of total expenditures for social benefits between 2011 and 2013. 25% of welfare fraud is committed by foreigners, who make up 12.5% of the population.

Canada
In Canada, about 3.5% of total employment insurance expenditure was attributable to fraud and error in 2003. The total fraud and error rate in welfare allowances is estimated to be 3-5%.

Denmark
A day off qualifying period before sickness benefit may be claimed was introduced in 1985. It was abolished two years later when it turned out that employees instead reported themselves sick for more than one day.

France
In France, fraud estimates by the Family Branch (branche famille) amount to 2,000 to 3,000 cases per year.

Germany

In 2015, 978,809 sanctions were imposed on people who received unemployment benefits. 75% were moderate sanctions for failure to report information. At least one sanction was imposed on 131,520 beneficiaries, or 3% of total.

The German government has estimated that the amounts lost through welfare fraud were 6% of the amounts lost through tax avoidance and subvention fraud.

German authorities assume that welfare fraud by relatively well-off people of Turkish origin is common, although there is no statistics concerning its scope. It is easy to register as indigent in Germany, although one may have financial assets in Turkey. In Braunschweig asylum seekers were able to defraud the government of £3 to £5 million euros in some 300 cases by creating multiple identities.

A criminal network engaging in welfare fraud was revealed in 2016. It is suspected to have been led by a parliamentarian who provided Bulgarians and Romanians with false work contracts and collected millions of Euros.

Ireland
Informal briefing reports from the Department of Social Protection in Ireland revealed that reports of welfare frauds increased by 2500% between 2008 and 2013. The Irish Examiner earlier noticed, "gone are the days when this crime – and that's the correct term – was greeted with knowing nods, winks and grudging admiration for certain people who knew the system inside out and 'could get away with it."

Israel
Social Security estimates that fraud or error accounts for 5% of its budget annually. In 2005, the head of the agency estimated that 7,000 of the 150,000 income maintenance recipients succeed in defrauding the system every year. In a 2013 study, 34 of 49 welfare recipients unequivocally admitted to fraud.

A Channel 10 report contended that thousands of haredim who nominally study Torah full-time are in essence working illegally. When their reporter Dov Gilhar advertised in Bnei Brak for workers for a fictitious company, it turned out that most applicants intended to exploit the benefits they receive as yeshiva students, although they would work. Nine out of ten "candidates" who were filmed by the hidden cameras exhibited extensive knowledge of defrauding the system. Several haredi yeshivas have been engaging in fraud by enrolling fictitious students in order to receive the living stipends for full-time Torah students. Hundreds of fake students were reported, and millions of shekels received. A report from the Education Ministry and the accountant general of the Finance Ministry concluded that the number of 120,000 yeshiva students claimed by the haredi schools was exaggerated by five to ten thousand.

Japan 
In 2010, a Tokyo family was suspected of fraud after claiming pensions for a man for 30 years after his alleged death. His 'skeletal remains' were found still in the family home.

Netherlands
In the Netherlands, surveys on fraudulent behavior in disability and old age benefits among others are undertaken. They show that between 10 and 20% of claimants show some form of fraudulent behavior. Large-scale survey research indicates that welfare fraud is more common in the Netherlands than in Britain or America. One study revealed a 17% participation in the black economy by welfare benefit recipients, while another found a 28% participation rate. The vast majority of these earned less than 1,500 guilders ($700) a year from this activity.

Norway
In 2011, the Norwegian Labour and Welfare Administration had over 100 Somali women who had divorced their husbands to claim extra income support as the sole provider for the family, then had more children to their ex-husbands. Each family had defrauded state agencies out of an average 80 thousand euro. On average, sole providers receive 1,500 euro monthly per child. The welfare system is based on trust.

A woman of the Roma people illegally received in excess of $1,400,000 by deceiving the Norwegian welfare authorities for 23 years. Techniques used were claiming for 17 fictitious grandchildren, and claiming her son was autistic, nursing him through the age of 13 in meetings with welfare workers. She was sentenced to 5.5 years in prison. After the authorities started investigating such issues, they found 74 cases of false identities made by Roma people in the civil registry. Every false identity may cost the government 11 million crowns ($1.28 million). Among Roma people in Norway, it is considered a normal way of making money.

Sweden
The Swedish National Audit Office estimated the annual losses due to fraud or error to be from 5.3 billion kronor ($793 million) to 7.4 billion ($1.1 billion) in 1995. In 2007, the Delegation Against Incorrect Payments estimated that 20 billion crowns ($2.2 billion) were being overpaid due to fraud or error, fraud comprising half of the sum. It was found that 4-6% of unemployment benefits were being paid to people who were in fact working but did not report their work.

Linked processing of the data for housing allowances and for sickness insurance has taken place in Sweden since 1979. This has created, in the words of Eckart Kuhlborn, "a crime prevention eldorado" by making it possible to identify households which have reported different incomes. A check of 70% of the households that received both kinds of payments showed that 2.7% had cheated by giving false information about their incomes. The next year, the figure had decreased to 1.2%. As the check was discussed in the mass media before it was executed the first year, recipients of housing allowances may have been aware of the risk with cheating, so a higher level of fraud before the check – and a greater preventive effect – cannot be ruled out. Neither can it be known how many were smart enough to under-report their income to all the relevant bodies (although under-reporting incomes to sickness insurance authorities would mean a smaller dole in case of sickness).

In Sweden, absence due to illness increased every time new legislation opened up the possibility for more sickness benefit. By the 1970s, it had become a big problem for companies, according to the Swedish Employer's Association, which claimed that this was a problem of work ethics and was partly unrelated to sickness and work environment. This interpretation was confirmed by the non-partisan Bjurel-commission.

Sickness absences among men relative to women have increased when great sporting events take place – a trend that has become more pronounced from the end of the 1980s to the early 2000s. The 1988 winter Olympics saw a 7% increase in sickness absence in men compared with women, for the 1987 World Championship in cross country-skiing the number was 16%, and for the 2002 football World Cup it was 41%.

Welfare fraud is widespread in the immigrant-dominated Rosengård, where one is considered smart if he is able to work and claim unemployment benefits simultaneously, and one is considered strange if he does not take the opportunity.

According to Statistics Sweden, 40,000 foreigners are registered in Sweden but no longer live there. They can continue to receive benefits, although they live abroad. When the authorities in Tensta decided that benefit recipients have to turn up at the welfare office in order to receive their money, one third did not turn up.

United Kingdom

The United Kingdom Department for Work and Pensions (DWP) defines benefit fraud as when someone obtains state benefit without being entitled to or deliberately failing to report a change in personal circumstances. The DWP claim that fraudulent benefit claims amounted to around £900 million in 2008-09.

A UK State of the Nation report published in 2010 estimated the total benefit fraud in the United Kingdom in 2009-10 to be approximately £1 billion. Figures from the Department for Work and Pensions show that benefit fraud is thought to have cost taxpayers £1.2 billion during 2012-13, up 9% from the year before. A poll conducted by the Trades Union Congress in 2012 found that perceptions among the British public were that benefit fraud was high. On average, people thought that 27% of the British welfare budget was claimed fraudulently, but official UK government figures have stated that the proportion of fraud stood at 0.7% of the total welfare budget in 2011-12. In 2006-07, DWP estimated that it spent £154 million on fraud investigation, yet only recovered £22 million.

Disability benefits are easier to illegally obtain than other benefits, and are becoming targeted by systematic fraudsters motivated by greed. Although the Benefit Integrity Project concluded that disability benefit fraud was "minimal," the 1997 disability benefits review found that 12.2% of claims were fraudulent.

United States

Welfare fraud, which may include state or federal benefits, is low in incident numbers but widespread geographically, much of it committed by persons other than the benefit recipients; some of it stolen from them or collected after their death by others not entitled to it. Incidents of government program workers stealing or diverting benefits were prosecuted.
In 2016, the Office of Investigations for the Social Security Administration received 143,385 allegations and opened 8,048 cases. Of those cases, about 1,162 persons were convicted for crime. Recoveries amounted to $52.6 million, fines to $4.5 million, settlements/judgements to $1.7 million and restitution to $70 million. The estimated savings were $355.7 million.  
Charles Murray has suggested that the actual number of people who are unable to work must have gone down since 1960 as a result of medical advances, improved safety devices, and a decrease in occupations requiring manual work. Yet the percentage of people qualifying for federal disability benefits rose from 0.7 percent of the size of the labor force in 1960 to 5.3 percent in 2010 despite no substantial changes to the legal definition of physical disability.

However, the aging of the very populous generation, the baby boomers, who were young in the 1960s-1980s, partly accounts for a rise in recent decade's disability claims as well as very high numbers of Social Security benefit claims. They are retiring and not as healthy as the preceding generation, generally speaking. Suspicions and assumptions are being made that don't actually point to fraud in that case and many others. This type of erroneous suspicion and resentment is very common in the popular mythos surrounding government benefits of various kinds. The myths are many, and can prevent people from receiving essential life sustaining help in time of need, due to severe restrictions based on popular demand of the well housed and well fed.

In 2010, less than one-quarter of new welfare applications in San Diego County, California, had some form of discrepancy, whether error or fraud. That county has a high number of non-citizens, which sector has been demonstrated to have a high proportion of fraud. In response to the perception of state official's volume of fraud cases, the application process has become more strict. Some advocates have expressed concern that the stricter application process would make it more difficult for families in need to receive aid.

In Florida, from July to October 2011, cash welfare recipients were drug-tested, with advanced notice, and only 2.6% of the tests came back positive. Thus, 97.4% of recipients who chose to partake in the testing program were not using any kind of illegal or illicit drugs. Of the 2.6% who tested positive, most people tested positive for marijuana. Governor Rick Scott eventually stopped pursuing people on welfare to get tested.
In the first half of the fiscal year 2012, the office of the Inspector General of the Social Security Administration was able to detect frauds that cost the government over $253 million.

Water dumping
Water dumping is a phrase referring to purchasing bottled water on food stamps in states with bottle deposit for the purpose of emptying them out and returning containers for their redemption value to obtain cash. Motive includes funding drug habits. A heroin user and other transient encampment occupants in Portland, Oregon, interviewed by a journalist reported addicts purchase pallets of water using food benefits and redeeming the containers for cash.

Combating fraud
The costs of policing and prosecuting welfare fraud are high, though largely unmeasured. They may include labor costs of investigators, prosecutors, public defenders, judges, and probation officers, administrative costs for welfare diversion programs, prison costs, and costs for placing children in foster care if the sole parent serves time for welfare fraud. In 2008, California spent three times as much in policing welfare fraud as the amount of overpayment. The US Federal government has recouped hundreds of millions from fraudsters and other misappropriations of funds, from the Social Security Administration alone. This represents all types of fraud, not just recipient fraud. In many cases, the recipients were victims of stolen benefits.

Investigation and prosecution of fraud was intensified in Britain in the late 1970s. A peak was reached in 1980-81, when 20,105 people were prosecuted for welfare fraud. The Rayner commission recommended a more cost-effective approach involving non-prosecution interviews. Special Claims Control Units conducted "blitzes" in target areas and persuaded claimants to withdraw their claims, thereby avoiding expensive prosecutions. In the 1990s, advertising campaigns and "Shop a Cheat" hotlines were introduced. The campaigns led to increases in tip-offs and successful prosecutions, but there is no evidence of a lasting impact on benefit fraud loss.

Attitudes to welfare fraud

59% of Australians said that welfare fraud is seriously wrong, while 38% think it is "wrong" but not seriously. Welfare fraud was condemned as being harsher than tax evasion, which may be partly due to the view of welfare as rehabilitation – a way of providing a temporary helping hand to help people who have had hard luck getting back on their feet – so that fraud provides prima facie proof evidence that welfare is not working.

Data from the World Value Survey indicates that the acceptance of illegal benefit claims has increased in most industrial countries. This erosion of social norms has been most marked in Sweden, where the share of respondents answering that claiming government benefits to which one is not entitled is always wrong has dropped from 81.5% to 55.3% from the early 1980s to the early 2000s. The data from 2005–08, however, showed an increase to 61.0%. Attitudes vary greatly according to age, with younger people being much more inclined to accept welfare fraud.

Welfare fraud often reflects an idea that people have a moral right to proper financial support from the government. An Israeli study showed that 47 of 49 women on welfare openly and actively justified acts of welfare fraud, including eight persons who did not admit to committing fraud themselves. They based their claim on recipient's social contribution through motherhood, their past and present efforts to participate in the paid labor market, or their past military service. By contrast, an American study showed great assent to the rules of the welfare system by welfare recipients, even as they found it impossible to comply with the rules.

Explanations

Poverty
Most who commit welfare fraud or benefits fraud, are businesses; persons who are not the beneficiary; or recipients who live under precarious circumstances and feel that they do not have much of a choice. Some belong to the new underclass – marked by low social status, limited education and inadequate qualifications – and do not easily find employment and are receptive to opportunities offered by their social network, which may include the "informal economy." The inflexibility of the system makes reporting short works unprofitable or inconvenient, which undermines some welfare recipient's belief in the legitimacy of the system. Many fraudsters find the type of jobs available to them incompatible with their responsibilities as caretakers. There are also studies which indicate that a majority of fraudsters are not motivated primarily by severe economic problems. Data from the World Values Surveys show that higher rates of unemployment tend to lead to lower levels of benefit morale in the population, as more people are familiar with the situation of being a benefit recipient and know the cost of dispensing with it.

Norms

There is also a clear correlation between increased social spending and deteriorating benefit morale, a phenomenon predicted by economist Assar Lindbeck. The size of the welfare state does not correlate with low benefit morale, since a high benefit morale is a precondition for viable welfare states; it is the growth of the welfare state that predicts deteriorating benefit morale. The Swedish example illustrates this with declining benefit morale accompanying the development of a generous welfare state, and a break in the trend following the roll-back of the state since the 1990s. Detrimental effects of the welfare state are consistent with the large cohort differences in benefit morale.

Differential association and social disorganisation leads to subgroups holding deviant value systems, which may include tolerance of, and even expectations of, welfare fraud. Although there is evidence for a prevalent fraud culture influencing social cohesion in some neighborhoods, this is a politically sensitive issue. The Department for Work and Pensions in the UK has a policy of refraining from routinely identifying cultural clusters where welfare fraud is likely to be most prevalent.

Deterrence
Deterrence is ineffective. Many assess the risk of being caught as minimal, and it has been suggested that a widespread lack of understanding and underprediction of the sanctions for breaking the rules may contribute to this. A study of how people would do in hypothetic situations showed large differences between various risk alternatives. In an Israeli study of welfare recipients, all interviewees personally knew people who had been caught, and most had been subject to investigations and surveillance, yet they stated clearly that the risk of facing punishment (including criminal charges) did not affect their behavior.

See also
 Criticisms of welfare
 Medicare fraud

References

External links
 XML and XLS Unemployment Insurance Improper Payments - data sheets released yearly by the US Department of Labor

 
Fraud
Crime